Bruce Hall may refer to:

Bruce Hall (musician) (born 1953), bass guitarist for REO Speedwagon
Bruce Hall (photographer), legally blind photographer
Bruce Hall, vocalist for Agent Steel

Places 
Bruce Hall (Australian National University), a hall of residence at the Australian National University
Bruce Hall (University of Pittsburgh), a residence hall at the University of Pittsburgh

Hall, Bruce